Midnight Express is a 1978 prison drama film directed by Alan Parker and adapted by Oliver Stone from Billy Hayes's 1977 memoir of the same name. The film centers on Hayes (played by Brad Davis), a young American student, who is sent to a Turkish prison for trying to smuggle hashish out of the country. The film's title is prison slang for his escape attempt. The cast also features Irene Miracle, John Hurt, Bo Hopkins, Paul L. Smith and Randy Quaid.

Upon release, Midnight Express received generally positive reviews from critics. Many praised Davis's performance as well as the cast, the writing, the direction, and the musical score by Giorgio Moroder. Hayes and others criticized the film for portraying the Turkish prison men as violent and villainous and for deviating too much from the source material. 

The film was nominated for Best Picture and  Best Director for Parker at the 51st Academy Awards in 1979, and won Best Adapted Screenplay for Stone and Best Original Score for Moroder. It also won six Golden Globes, including Best Motion Picture – Drama and BAFTA Awards for Best Direction, Best Editing and Best Actor in a Supporting Role (for Hurt).

Plot
On vacation in Istanbul, Turkey in 1970, American college student Billy Hayes straps  of hashish bricks to his chest. As he and his girlfriend Susan are about to board a plane back to the United States, Billy is detained by Turkish police (who are on high alert for terrorist attacks), arrested and strip-searched.

A shadowy American – whom Billy nicknames "Tex" for his thick Texan accent – arrives and accompanies Billy to a police station and translates for him. Billy claims he bought the hashish from a taxicab driver and offers to help police locate him in exchange for being released. At a nearby market, Billy points out the cab driver to police, who arrest him, but they have no intention of releasing Billy. He attempts to escape, only to be recaptured at gunpoint by Tex.

During his first night in Sultanahmet Jail, a freezing-cold Billy sneaks out of his cell and steals a blanket. He is later rousted from his cell and brutally beaten by chief guard Hamidou for the theft. A few days later, Billy awakens in Sağmalcılar Prison, surrounded by fellow Western prisoners Jimmy (an American who stole two candlesticks from a mosque), Max (an English heroin addict), and Erich (a Swedish drug smuggler). Jimmy warns Billy that the prison is dangerous for foreigners and says no one can be trusted, not even young children.

Billy meets with his father, a U.S. representative, and a Turkish lawyer to discuss his situation. During Billy's trial, the prosecutor makes a case against him for drug smuggling. The lead judge is sympathetic to Billy and gives him a four-year sentence for drug possession. Billy and his father are devastated, but their Turkish lawyer insists it is a good result because the prosecutor wanted a life sentence.

Jimmy wants Billy to join an escape attempt through the prison's subterranean tunnels. Billy, due to be released soon, declines. Jimmy goes alone and is caught, then brutally beaten. Fifty-three days before his release, Billy learns the Turkish High Court in Ankara has overturned his sentence after an appeal by the prosecution. The prosecutor who originally wanted Billy convicted of smuggling rather than the lesser charge of possession finally had his way. Billy has been resentenced to serve 30 years.

In desperation, Billy accompanies Jimmy and Max to try to escape through the catacombs below the prison. They give up after running into endless dead-ends. A particularly sycophantic prisoner named Rifki, who routinely acts as an informant in exchange for favors, tips off the guards about the escape attempt and Jimmy is taken away again for punishment and is never seen from then on. Billy's imprisonment becomes harsh and brutal: terrifying scenes of physical and mental torture follow one another, and Billy has a breakdown. He brutally beats Rifki, killing him. He is sent to the prison's ward for the insane, where he wanders about in a daze among the other disturbed and catatonic prisoners.

In 1975, Billy's girlfriend, Susan, visits him. Devastated by Billy's condition, she tells him he must get out or else die. She leaves him a scrapbook with money hidden inside to help Billy escape. Her visit strongly helps Billy regains his senses. He tries to bribe Hamidou to take him to the prison hospital, but instead Hamidou forces Billy to a room, then tries to rape him. They struggle until Hamidou is killed after being pushed into the wall, his head impaled upon a coat hook. Billy dons the guard's uniform and walks out of the front door to freedom.

The epilogue shows that in October 1975, Billy crossed the border to Greece and arrived home three weeks later.

Cast

Production

Although the story is set largely in Turkey, the movie was filmed almost entirely at Fort Saint Elmo in Valletta, Malta, after permission to film in Istanbul was denied. The end credits state the movie was made entirely on location in Malta. However, background shots of Istanbul were taken by a small crew pretending to be making a cigarette commercial.

A made-for-television documentary about the film, I'm Healthy, I'm Alive, and I'm Free (alternative title: The Making of Midnight Express), was released on January 1, 1977. It is seven minutes long, and features commentary from the cast and crew on how they worked together during production, and the effort it took from beginning to completion. It also includes footage from the creation of the film, and Hayes's emotional first visit to the prison set.

Differences from the book
Various aspects of Billy Hayes's story were fictionalized or added for the movie:
 In the movie, Hayes is in Turkey with his girlfriend when he is arrested; in real life, he was travelling alone.
 Although Billy spent 17 days in the prison's psychiatric hospital in 1972 in the book, he never bit out anyone's tongue, which, in the film, leads to him being committed to the section for the criminally insane.
 The book ends with Hayes being moved to İmralı prison, on an island from which he eventually escapes by stealing a dinghy, rowing  in a raging storm across the Sea of Marmara, traveling by foot and by bus to Istanbul, and then crossing the border into Greece. In the film, that passage is replaced by a violent scene in which he unwittingly kills the head guard who is preparing to rape him. (In the book, Hamidou, the chief guard, was killed in 1973 by a recently paroled prisoner, who spotted him drinking tea at a café outside the prison, and shot him eight times.) The attempted rape scene itself was fictionalized; Billy never claimed in the book to have suffered any sexual violence at the hands of either his Turkish guards, wardens, or fellow inmates, but engaged in consensual homosexual activity while he was in prison. The film depicts Hayes having an intimate relationship with fellow prisoner Erich the Swede.
 There is a fleeting reference to the popular restaurant The Pudding Shop, in the bazaar. It is actually on Divan Yolu, the main avenue through historic Old Istanbul.

Release
The film screened at the 1978 Cannes Film Festival. It opened at the Odeon Haymarket in London on Thursday, 10 August 1978 grossing $3,472 in its opening day, a Columbia Pictures record in the UK. It opened in New York on 6 October 1978 before opening nationwide in the United States on 27 October.

Home media
The film was first released on VHS and Betamax by Columbia Pictures Home Entertainment in 1979. It made its DVD debut in 1998. A 30th Anniversary DVD of the film was released in 2008, and a Blu-ray was released in 2009.

Reception
According to the film review aggregator Rotten Tomatoes, 93% of critics gave the film positive reviews, based on 28 reviews with an average rating of 7.6/10. The website's critics consensus reads: "Raw and unrelenting, Midnight Express is riveting in its realistic depiction of incarceration -- mining pathos from the simple act of enduring hardship." On Metacritic, the film has a weighted average score of 59 out of 100, based on 11 critics, indicating "mixed or average reviews".

Roger Ebert gave Midnight Express three stars out of four in a review that concluded, "The movie creates spellbinding terror, all right; my only objection is that it's so eager to have us sympathize with Billy Hayes." Gene Siskel gave the film two and a half stars out of four and called it "a powerful film, but we leave the theater thinking it should have been more so. It was for that reason that I was persuaded to read the book, which is where I found the story I had been expecting to see on the screen." He also thought that Brad Davis "is simply not up to the lead role. He appears unsure of himself and, like the film itself, he overacts." Arthur D. Murphy of Variety wrote, "Acceptance of the film depends a lot on forgetting several things," namely that Hayes was smuggling drugs. Nevertheless, he thought Davis gave "a strong performance" and that "Alan Parker's direction and other credits are also admirable, once you swallow the specious and hypocritical story." Charles Champlin, of the Los Angeles Times, was positive, writing that the film "has a kind of wailing, arid authenticity and enormous power. It is strong and uncompromising stuff, made bearable by its artistry and the saving awareness that Hayes, at least, slipped free and lived to tell the tale." Gary Arnold, of The Washington Post, described the film as "outrageously sensationalistic" and "loaded with show-stopping fabrications,” and wrote of the protagonist that "there's never a compelling reason for sympathizing with the callow boy he appears to be from start to finish."

Allegations of Turkophobia 
Midnight Express was also criticized for its unfavorable portrayal of Turkish people. In her 1991 book Turkish Reflections: A Biography of Place, Mary Lee Settle wrote: "The Turks I saw in Lawrence of Arabia and Midnight Express were like cartoon caricatures, compared to the people I had known and lived among for three of the happiest years of my life." Pauline Kael, in reviewing the film for The New Yorker, commented, "This story could have happened in almost any country, but if Billy Hayes had planned to be arrested to get the maximum commercial benefit from it, where else could he get the advantages of a Turkish jail? Who wants to defend Turks? (They don’t even constitute enough of a movie market for Columbia Pictures to be concerned about how they are represented.)" One reviewer, writing for World Film Directors, wrote: "Midnight Express is 'more violent, as a national hate-film than anything I can remember', 'a cultural form that narrows horizons, confirming the audience’s meanest fears and prejudices and resentments'."

David Denby of New York criticized Midnight Express as "merely anti-Turkish, and hardly a defense of prisoners' rights or a protest against prison conditions." Denby said also that all Turks in the film – guardian or prisoner – were portrayed as "losers" and "swine", and that "without exception [all the Turks] are presented as degenerate, stupid slobs".

The well-known Spanish film magazine Fotogramas had this to say: "One of the most sibylline exercises in racism ever produced, and one peddled under a progressive label to boot. The true story of an American arrested in Turkey for drug trafficking becomes a nightmare resolved with a sensationalism that is impactful yet worthy of a better cause, as is always the case in its director's career".

Norman Stone described it as a "brilliant, but quite misleading, film".

Box office
The film was made for $2.3 million and grossed over $35 million worldwide.

In 1978, the Turkish government unsuccessfully attempted to prevent the film from being screened in Israel.

Awards and nominations

Soundtrack

Released on October 6, 1978, by Casablanca Records, the soundtrack to Midnight Express was composed by Italian synth-pioneer Giorgio Moroder. The score won the Academy Award for Best Original Score in 1979.
 "Chase" – Giorgio Moroder (8:24)
 "Love's Theme" – Giorgio Moroder (5:33)
 "(Theme from) Midnight Express" (Instrumental) – Giorgio Moroder (4:39)
 "Istanbul Blues" (Vocal) – David Castle (3:17)
 "The Wheel" – Giorgio Moroder (2:24)
 "Istanbul Opening" – Giorgio Moroder (4:43)
 "Cacaphoney" – Giorgio Moroder (2:58)
 "(Theme from) Midnight Express" (Vocal) – Chris Bennett (4:47)

Charts

Legacy

The quote 'Have you ever been in a Turkish prison?', in the American comedy film Airplane! (1980), is a reference to Midnight Express.

Susan's prison visit was spoofed in the 1996 film The Cable Guy, where Jim Carrey opens his shirt, presses his naked breast against the glass, and cries, 'Oh, Billy!'

An amateur interview with Billy Hayes appeared on YouTube, recorded during the 1999 Cannes Film Festival. He describes his experiences and expresses his disappointment with the film adaptation. In an article for the Seattle Post-Intelligencer, Hayes is reported as saying that the film 'depicts all Turks as monsters'.

Giorgio Moroder's work "The Chase" is often used as bumper music on the American late-night radio talk show radio program Coast to Coast AM.

In pro wrestling, several tag teams were called The Midnight Express. Original member Dennis Condrey said the name reflected how they dressed in black, drove black cars and partied past midnight. The most popular iteration, Bobby Eaton and Stan Lane, used the film's theme, "Chase", as their entrance music.

When he visited Turkey in 2004, screenwriter Oliver Stone - who won an Academy Award for writing the screenplay for Midnight Express - apologized for the portrayal of the Turkish people in the film. He "eventually apologized for tampering with the truth".

"Theme from Midnight Express" is sampled on J Dilla's "Phantom of the Synths", which is prominently used on "Gazzillion Ear", produced by J Dilla and performed by MF Doom, released in 2005 and 2009 respectively.

Hayes, Stone, and Alan Parker were invited to attend a special screening of Midnight Express, with prisoners in the garden of an L-type prison in Döşemealtı, Turkey, as part of the 47th Antalya Golden Orange Film Festival in October 2010.

Dialogue from Midnight Express was sampled in the song "Sanctified" on the original version of Pretty Hate Machine, the debut album from Nine Inch Nails; the sample was removed from the 2010 remaster, for copyright reasons.

In 2016, Parker returned to Malta as a special guest during the second edition of the Valletta Film Festival to attend a screening of the film on 4 June at Fort St Elmo, where many of the prison scenes were filmed.

See also
 Return to Paradise
 Brokedown Palace

References

External links

 
 
 
 Script of movie by Oliver Stone (PDF)

1977 films
1977 soundtrack albums
1970s biographical films
1977 crime drama films
1977 independent films
1977 LGBT-related films
1970s prison drama films
American biographical films
American films about cannabis
American independent films
American prison drama films
American LGBT-related films
British biographical films
British films about cannabis
British independent films
British prison drama films
British LGBT-related films
Best Drama Picture Golden Globe winners
Films featuring a Best Supporting Actor Golden Globe winning performance
Biographical films about drug traffickers
Cannabis in Turkey
Columbia Pictures films
Drama films based on actual events
Films scored by Giorgio Moroder
Films about cannabis
Films based on autobiographies
Films directed by Alan Parker
Films produced by David Puttnam
Films set in Greece
Films set in Istanbul
Films set in prison
Films set in Turkey
Films shot in Malta
Films that won the Best Original Score Academy Award
Films whose director won the Best Direction BAFTA Award
Films whose writer won the Best Adapted Screenplay Academy Award
Films about prison escapes
Films with screenplays by Oliver Stone
Torture in films
Works about cannabis trafficking
American neo-noir films
Drama film soundtracks
Biographical films about writers
1970s English-language films
1970s American films
1970s British films